Patrick James Moloney (20 March 1869 – 4 September 1947) was an Irish Sinn Féin politician. Prior to entering politics he was a chemist.

Moloney was actively involved in the Republican movement in Tipperary. He was arrested and jailed in the mass arrests after the 1916 Easter Rising.  The meeting to elect brigade officers for the 3rd Tipperary Brigade was held in his house in Church street, Tipperary. The house was burnt down during the war by British forces. His three sons were active members of the brigade. One of his sons, Con became Adjutant General of the anti-Treaty IRA during the Civil War another of his sons, Patrick, was killed during the War of Independence.

He was elected as a Sinn Féin MP for the Tipperary South constituency at the 1918 general election. In January 1919, Sinn Féin MPs refused to recognise the Parliament of the United Kingdom and instead assembled at the Mansion House in Dublin as a revolutionary parliament called Dáil Éireann. He was elected unopposed as a Sinn Féin Teachta Dála (TD) for the Tipperary Mid, North and South constituency at the 1921 elections.

He opposed the Anglo-Irish Treaty and voted against it. He was re-elected for the same constituency at the 1922 general election, this time as an anti-Treaty Sinn Féin TD, but he did not take his seat in the Dáil. He did not contest the 1923 general election.

A great-grandson is the Irish historian Eunan O'Halpin.

References

1869 births
1947 deaths
Early Sinn Féin TDs
Members of the 1st Dáil
Members of the 2nd Dáil
Members of the 3rd Dáil
Members of the Parliament of the United Kingdom for County Tipperary constituencies (1801–1922)
UK MPs 1918–1922
Politicians from County Tipperary